A Season in Hell is Chicago pop-punk band October Fall's first and only album, released on February 21, 2006.

Track listing

Personnel
October Fall
 Pat D'Andrea – lead vocals, Guitar
 Clark Harrison - lead guitar, backing vocals
 Nick Scalise – Drums, percussion 
 Owen Toomey aka O-Boats – piano, backing vocals 
 Greg Shanahan – bass, backing vocals

Guest musicians
 Patrick Stump (Fall Out Boy) – Additional vocals on "Second Chances".
 Hayley Williams (Paramore) – Additional vocals on "Keep Dreaming Upside Down" and backing vocals on "Caught In the Rain"

References

2006 debut albums
October Fall albums
Decaydance Records albums
Fueled by Ramen albums